Clara Brown, also known as John G. Alden Design No. 872, is a historic racing sloop located at Buffalo in Erie County, New York. It was designed by John G. Alden and built by Goudy & Stevens Shipyard in Boothbay, Maine. It was designed in 1950 and launched in 1952. She was moved to Buffalo in the mid-1980s after sailing on Lake Champlain.

It was listed on the National Register of Historic Places in 2013.

References

External links
National Register of Historic Places Program Featured Property
Buffalo Rising: Sail Buffalo’s floating classroom arrives…

Ships on the National Register of Historic Places in New York (state)
Buildings and structures completed in 1952
Buildings and structures in Buffalo, New York
National Register of Historic Places in Buffalo, New York
Transportation in Erie County, New York